Bassjackers is an electronic dance music duo, formed in 2007, consisting of Marlon Flohr and Ralph van Hilst, two Dutch DJs and producers.

Albums

Studio albums

Extended plays 
2009
 Sujo Soja

2016
 Destiny

2017
 Les Pays Bass

2018
 Les Pays Bass, Vol. 2
2020

2020
 Les Pays Bass, Vol. 3
2020

Singles

Charted singles

Other singles 
2010:
 Clifton [Samsobeats]
 Showrocker (with The Partysquad) [Spinnin' Records]
 Bang Like A (with Ralvero) [Spinnin' Records]

2011:
 Rambo (with Ralvero) [Spinnin' Records]
 Mush, Mush [Musical Freedom]
 Brougham/Contour (with Apster) [Wall (Spinnin' Records)]

2012:
 Bronx (with Yves V) [Smash the House (Spinnin' Records)]
 Let’s Get Weird [Free download]
 Ria (with Angger Dimas) [Doorn (Spinnin' Records)]
 Hey! (with Showtek) [Spinnin' Records]

2013:
 Grid (with Dyro) [Spinnin' Records]
 Duckface (with Kenneth G) [Hysteria Recs]
 Collision (with Ferry Corsten) [Spinnin' Records]
 Raise Those Hands (with R3hab) [Fly Eye Records]
 Flag (with Gregori Klosman) [Spinnin' Records]
 Zing [Protocol Recordings]
 Gamer (with GRX) [Doorn (Spinnin' Records)]

2014:
 Crackin (Martin Garrix Edit) [Spinnin' Records]
 Battle (with Jordy Dazz) [Doorn (Spinnin' Records)]
 Derp (with Makj) [Hysteria Recs]
 Rampage (with Kenneth G) [Revealed Recordings]
 Like That [Smash The House]
 Savior [Spinnin' Records]
 X (with Dyro) [Wolv]

2015:
 Wave Your Hands (with Thomas Newson) [Smash The House]
 What We Live For (with Afrojack) [Wall Recordings]
 Alamo (with Brooks) [Skink]
 Memories (with KSHMR featuring Sirah) [Spinnin' Records]
 Bring That Beat [Smash The House] 
 Sound Barrier (with Coone and GLDY LX) [Smash The House]
 Rough (with Reez) [Musical Freedom]

2016:
 SPCMN (with Crossnaders) [Free download]
 On The Floor Like (with Joe Ghost featuring MOTi) [Spinnin' Records]
 Marco Polo (with Breathe Carolina & Reez) [Spinnin' Records]
 F*CK (Dimitri Vegas & Like Mike Edit) [Smash The House]
 El Mariachi (with Jay Hardway) [Spinnin' Records]
 Dinosaur (with Jay Hardway) [Free Download/Spinnin' Records]
 Fireflies (featuring Luciana) [Spinnin' Premium]
 Destiny (featuring Mat B) [Spinnin' Premium]
 Extreme (with KSHMR featuring Sidnie Tipton) [Spinnin' Records]
 Pillowfight (vs. Skytech and Fafaq) [Spinnin' Records]

2017:
 Can't Take It (with Breathe Carolina featuring Cade) [Spinnin' Records]
 All Aboard (Dimitri Vegas & Like Mike Edit) (vs. D'Angello & Francis) [Smash The House]
 Joyride (with Brooks) [Spinnin' Records]
 These Heights (with Lucas & Steve featuring Caroline Pennell) [Spinnin' Records]
 Wobble & Jiggle [Spinnin' Records]
 The Fever (vs. Breathe Carolina and Apek) [Spinnin' Records]
 Ready (with L3N) [Spinnin' Records]

2018:
 Last Fight (vs. Crossnaders) [Smash The House]
 Are You Randy? (with Bali Bandits) [Musical Freedom]
 The Riddle [Smash The House]
 Switch (with Blasterjaxx) [Maxximize Records]
 The Jungle (with Dimitri Vegas & Like Mike) [Smash The House]
 Block (with Sunstars) [Spinnin' Records]
 Bounce (with Dimitri Vegas & Like Mike, Julian Banks featuring Snoop Dogg) [Smash The House]
 Zero Fs Given (with Wolfpack)

2019:
 No Style (with Apster) [Spinnin' Records]
 Flip the Beat (with Apek) [Spinnin' Records]
You're Next (with Dimitri Vegas & Like Mike) (from Mortal Kombat 11) [Smash The House]
Momento (with Twiig) [Spinnin' Records]
Snatch [Spinnin' Records]
Mortal Kombat Anthem (with Dimitri Vegas & Like Mike and 2WEI) [Smash The House]
Limitless (with Jaxx & Vega) [Spinnin' Records]
The Flight (with Dimitri Vegas & Like Mike and D'Angello & Francis) [Smash The House]
Primal (with Dr Phunk) [Spinnin' Records]
I Wanna Rave (with Steve Aoki) [Ultra Records]
Mush Mush (2019 Reboot) [Musical Freedom]

2020:
Big Orgus 2020 (with DJ Furax) [Smash The House]
Happy Together (with Dimitri Vegas & Like Mike) [Smash The House]
Want You (So Bad) [Spinnin' Records]
Motivation [Smash The House]
Old Money (with Wolfpack featuring Richie Loop) [Smash The House]
Run Away (with Jaxx & Vega and Futuristic Polar Bears) [Smash The House]
Halloween (with Wolfpack and Baba Yega) [Smash The House]
Jingle Bells [Smash The House]
Born to Run (with Dr. Phunk) [Smash The House]
Bonzai Channel One (with Dimitri Vegas & Like Mike and Crossnaders) [Smash The House]

2021
Show Me Your Love [Smash The House]
Snake Whisperer (with Ang) [Smash The House]
Helter Skelter (with Moti) [Smash The House]
Say What U Want [Smash The House]
Arabian Nights (with Diètro) [Smash The House]
Scream It (with Makj) [Smash The House]
Written In The Stars (with Tungevaag) [Spinnin' Records]
In Doge We Trust (with PleasrDao) [Smash The House]
All My Love (with Skytech) [Cyb3rpvnk]
The Weekend [Smash The House]

2022
De La Sol (with Makj) [Spinnin' Records]
Dumb Dumb (with Mattn featuring Emy Perez) [Smash The House]
Psycho (with Harris & Ford featuring Rebecca Helena) [Spinnin' Records]

Remixes

References

Notes
 A  Did not enter the Singles Top 100 or Ultratop 50, but peaked on the Dance chart.
 B  Did not enter the Ultratop 50, but peaked on the Ultratip chart.
 C  Did not enter the Ultratop 50, but peaked on the Dance Bubbling Under chart.

Sources

Discographies of Dutch artists
Electronic music group discographies